Antoine Wesley (born October 22, 1997) is an American football wide receiver for the Arizona Cardinals of the National Football League (NFL). He played college football at Texas Tech.

Early years
Wesley attended Cibolo Steele in Cibolo, Texas. During his career he had 74 receptions for 1,192 yards and 15 touchdowns. He committed to Texas Tech University to play college football.

College career
Wesley had 10 receptions for 137 yards combined his first two years at Texas Tech. As a junior in 2018, he was named an All-American after he had 88 receptions for 1,410 yards and nine touchdowns. During the season, he set a school record for receiving yards in a game with 261. Wesley entered the 2019 NFL Draft after the season.

Professional career

Baltimore Ravens
Wesley signed with the Baltimore Ravens as an undrafted free agent on May 3, 2019. He was waived on August 31, 2019, and was signed to the practice squad the next day. He signed a reserve/future contract with the Ravens on January 13, 2020.

On August 22, 2020, Wesley was placed on injured reserve with a shoulder injury.

Arizona Cardinals
On May 21, 2021, Wesley signed with the Arizona Cardinals. He was named the Cardinals fifth wide receiver on the depth chart to begin the 2021 season. He scored his first career touchdown in Week 16 on a 24-yard pass from Kyler Murray. He finished the season with 19 catches for 208 yards and three touchdowns.

On September 1, 2022, Wesley was placed on injured reserve.

References

External links
Texas Tech Red Raiders bio
Arizona Cardinals bio

1997 births
Living people
Players of American football from Nevada
Sportspeople from Las Vegas
American football wide receivers
Texas Tech Red Raiders football players
Baltimore Ravens players
Arizona Cardinals players